No ship of the United States Navy has ever borne the name USS Tiger Shark or Tigershark, but the name is popular for fictional submarines (although real submarines have been named ).

Fictional submarines
USS Tiger Shark is the setting for the 1951 movie Submarine Command, starring William Holden as a submarine captain haunted by a life and death decision made during wartime.
USS Tiger Shark is the setting for the 16th episode of the second season (1958) of the syndicated television anthology series The Silent Service.
Tiger Shark is a submarine featured in the 1959 sci-fi movie The Atomic Submarine.
USS Tigershark (SSN-28) is featured in the 1995 episode of the TV series JAG.
USS Tiger Shark is the setting for the 2002 suspense/horror movie Below.

See also
 List of fictional ships
 Ice Station Zebra (film), with a fictional U.S. Navy submarine named USS Tigerfish

Tigershark